Kyle Michael Bartsch (born March 10, 1991) is an American former professional baseball pitcher .

Career
Bartsch attended L. D. Bell High School in Hurst, Texas, and played for the school's baseball team. He began his college career at West Texas A&M University, where he played college baseball for the West Texas A&M Buffaloes. He transferred to Howard College, and played for the Howard Hawks, and then to University of South Alabama to play for the South Alabama Jaguars. In 2012, Bartsch had a 1–4 win–loss record with a 4.26 earned run average (ERA) and 10 saves with 39 strikeouts in 38 innings pitched for the Jaguars. In 2013, he had a 3–0 record with a 3.12 ERA and 12 saves, tying Michael Nakamura for the most in a single season and setting the new school record with 22. He was named second-team All-Sun Belt Conference. The American Baseball Coaches Association named Bartsch to their second-team South Central All-Region squad.

The Kansas City Royals selected Bartsch in the seventh round of the 2013 MLB draft. He played for the Idaho Falls Chukars in 2013, where he had a 2–1 win-loss record and a 2.45 ERA in 21 appearances. He pitched for the Wilmington Blue Rocks in 2014, where he had a 5–5 win-loss record and a 2.29 ERA in 41 appearances. On November 20, 2014, the Royals traded Bartsch to the San Diego Padres in exchange for Reymond Fuentes.

Bartsch spent 2015 with the Lake Elsinore Storm where he was 1-3 with a 4.60 ERA in 52 appearances and began 2016 with the San Antonio Missions. He was released by the Padres in May 2016, was signed by the Royals that same month, and was assigned to the Northwest Arkansas Naturals. In 25 games between San Antonio and Northwest Arkansas, he compiled a 2-1 record and 3.72 ERA.

References

External links

1991 births
Living people
People from Hurst, Texas
Baseball players from Texas
Baseball pitchers
Howard Hawks baseball players
West Texas A&M Buffaloes baseball players
South Alabama Jaguars baseball players
Idaho Falls Chukars players
Wilmington Blue Rocks players
Minor league baseball players